The 2006–07 Penn Quakers men's basketball team represented the University of Pennsylvania during the 2006–07 NCAA Division I men's basketball season. The Quakers, led by first-year head coach Glen Miller, played their home games at The Palestra as members of the Ivy League. They finished the season 22–9, 13–1 in Ivy League play to win the regular season championship. They received the Ivy League's automatic bid to the NCAA tournament where they lost in the First Round to No. 3 seed Texas A&M.

Roster

Schedule and results

|-
!colspan=9 style=| Regular season

|-
!colspan=9 style=| NCAA tournament

Awards and honors
Ibrahim Jaaber – Ivy League Player of the Year

References

Penn Quakers men's basketball seasons
Penn
Penn
Penn
Penn